Dr Malvika Sabharwal is an Indian gynecologist, laparoscopic surgeon andobstetrician at the Nova Specialty Hospitals of the Apollo Healthcare Group and at Jeewan Mala Hospital, New Delhi. The team led by her has been credited with the successful performance of the removal of the largest recorded fibroid through laparoscopic surgery. She leads the Gynae Endoscopy, a team of 140 doctors, involved in endoscopic surgical practices related to gynecology.

Sabharwal graduated in medicine (MBBS) from Lady Hardinge Medical College and secured her post graduate credentials (DGO) from the same institution before completing training in hysteroscopy under Wamsteker, Haarlem, the Netherlands and in laparoscopy under Adam Magos, Royal Free Hospital, UK. She is a member of several medical organizations such as Indian Association of Gynecological Endoscopists, Indian Fertility Society, Indian Menopausal Society, Indian Association of Endoscopic Surgeons, International Society of Gynecological Endoscopy, Gasless International, Association of Obstetrics and Gynaecology, and Association of Endoscopic Surgeons of India and has delivered several orations and keynote addresses. She is also known to have conducted several free health camps for women, children and employees. The Government of India awarded her the fourth highest civilian honour of the Padma Shri, in 2008, for her contributions to medicine.

References

External links 
 

Recipients of the Padma Shri in medicine
Year of birth missing (living people)
Indian gynaecologists
Indian women gynaecologists
Indian obstetricians
Delhi University alumni
Endoscopy
Living people
20th-century Indian medical doctors
20th-century Indian women scientists
20th-century women physicians